The Race Card is an idiomatic expression accusing someone of racism.

The Race Card may also refer to:
The Race Card (book), a 2001 political book by Tali Mendelberg
"The Race Card", the fifth episode of The People v. O. J. Simpson: American Crime Story

See also
 Racecard, a printed card used in horseracing
The Grace Card, a 2010 drama film